Astragalus congdonii is a species of milkvetch known by the common name Congdon's milkvetch. It is a perennial herb that is endemic to central California.

Description
Astragalus congdonii is a hairy perennial herb growing to heights between 20 and 70 centimeters. The sparse leaves are up to 14 centimeters long and are made up of several pairs of oval-shaped leaflets. The large, open inflorescence bears up to 35 cream-colored flowers, each about 1 to 1.5 centimeters long. The fruit is a narrow legume pod up to 3.5 centimeters long which dries to a thick papery texture. Flowers bloom March to June.

Distribution and habitat
Astragalus congdonii is endemic to the Sierra Nevada foothills of central California. Its habitats include canyon sides, open brushy banks, and serpentinized bedrocks.

References

External links
Jepson Manual Treatment - Astragalus congdonii
USDA Plants Profile
Astragalus congdonii Photo gallery

congdonii
Endemic flora of California
Flora of the Sierra Nevada (United States)